This is a list of recipients of the Sheikh Sabah Al-Ahmad Al-Jaber Al-Sabah Prize awarded by World Health Organization (WHO).

His Highness Sheikh Sabah Al-Ahmad Al-Jaber Al-Sabah (1929–2020) Prize is awarded for research in health care for the elderly and health promotion by the State of Kuwait Health Promotion Foundation to the individual(s) or institution(s). The prize consists of a certificate of achievement, a plaque from the organization's founder, and an amount of money that cannot exceed $40,000 USD.

List of recipients

See also 

 List of Ihsan Doğramacı Family Health Foundation Prize laureates
 List of Léon Bernard Foundation Prize laureates
 List of Sasakawa Health Prize laureates
 List of United Arab Emirates Health Foundation Prize laureates
 List of Dr LEE Jong-wook Memorial Prize for Public Health laureates
 List of Dr A.T. Shousha Foundation Prize and Fellowship laureates
 List of The State of Kuwait Prize for the Control of Cancer, Cardiovascular Diseases and Diabetes in the Eastern Mediterranean Region laureates
 List of Jacques Parisot Foundation Fellowship laureates
 List of The Darling Foundation Prize laureates

References 

World Health Organization
Public health
Sheikh Sabah Al-Ahmad Al-Jaber Al-Sabah Prize laureates